La Zone is a music venue for alternative and underground music in Liège, Belgium . It's located in Outremeuse, the island in the middle of Liège and is hosting a wide variety of musical bands from everywhere in the world, as well as theatre, exhibitions, workshops. 

With a mere capacity of 200, La Zone has been more and more successful throughout its existence and has now acquired a firmly established reputation for good fun and good discoveries in music thanks to the low entry prices which are offered.

The facility offers a wide range of musical styles from hardcore punk to ethno jazz. In fact, La Zone is only responsible for 1/5 of the annual 60 gigs, as the rest is programmed by outside collectives, making La Zone a place of public interest which can be used by any alternative collective looking for a venue for its gigs.

La Zone has become the regular headquarters of a number of different associations, most of which have different means of promotion. It also distributes CDs, records, and magazines for those groups which do not have commercial promotion and prefer to do it themselves (DIY ) and retain control of their own releases. It was the home venue of Hiatus.

Many side projects exist, such as their file on SABAM (the Belgian Author's Rights Society), an annual  short films festival and a monthly Slam scene.

See also
 List of concert halls

External links
 Official La Zone Web Site

Rock music venues
1991 establishments in Belgium
Concert halls in Belgium
Music venues in Belgium
Music venues completed in 1991